The 2020 Idaho Vandals football team represented the University of Idaho as a member of the Big Sky Conference during the 2020–21 NCAA Division I FCS football season. Led by seventh-year head coach Paul Petrino, the Vandals played their home games on campus at the Kibbie Dome in Moscow, Idaho.
 
Due to the COVID-19 pandemic, the season was delayed and started in late February 2021.

Previous season
The Vandals finished the 2019 season at 5–7 (3–5 in Big Sky, three-way tie for sixth).

Preseason

Polls
On July 23, 2020, during the virtual Big Sky Kickoff, the Vandals were predicted to finish ninth in the Big Sky by the coaches and eighth by the media.

Schedule
Idaho released their full schedule on November 7, 2019. The Vandals had games scheduled against  and Washington State, which were later canceled before the start of the 2020 season.

Due to the COVID-19 pandemic, the season was delayed and started in late February 2021.

References

Idaho
Idaho Vandals football seasons
Idaho Vandals football